Sometimes is the debut solo album by City and Colour, a side project of Dallas Green, a guitarist and singer for the band Alexisonfire. At first, the majority of these songs were only available at live shows or over the Internet through Peer-to-peer services. However, due to high demand, the songs were compiled onto a studio album and released through Dine Alone Records. "Comin' Home" was the only song on the album to not have been previously available. The album was awarded Alternative Album of the Year at the 2007 Juno Awards.

Sometimes was re-released on Vagrant Records on January 13, 2009, which was first time the album was available in physical form in the US.

Despite the album's relatively limited initial commercial success, it received widespread critical acclaim in its native Canada where it was certified gold in March 2006.

Background
Sometimes was co-produced by Green and Julius Butty; Butty engineer most of the songs, while four of them were engineered by Larry Thompson at Green's friend's house. Butty mixed the album before it was mastered by Brett Zilhali at Joao Carvalho Mastering.

Track listing
Track lising per booklet.

Personnel
Personnel per booklet.

City and Colour
 Dallas Green – vocals, guitar

Production
 Dallas Green – co-producer
 Julius Butty – co-producer, engineer (tracks 2–4, 6, 9 and 10), mixing
 Larry Thompson – engineer (tracks 1, 5, 7 and 8)
 Brett Zilhali – mastering
 Garnet – art direction, design
 Scott McEwan – tattoo artist

Allusions
"Sam Malone" was one of the first songs Green wrote as a teenager. Sam Malone is the name of the bartender in the TV show Cheers.
"In the Water I Am Beautiful" is a quote from the preface of Welcome to the Monkey House by Kurt Vonnegut Jr.
"Hello, I'm in Delaware" is a line from the 1992 film Wayne's World starring fellow Canadian Mike Myers.
"Sam Malone" has several lines taken from the Alexisonfire song, "Where No One Knows" from their self-titled debut.

References

City and Colour albums
2005 debut albums
Dine Alone Records albums
Juno Award for Alternative Album of the Year albums